Ferenc Szabó (born 18 September 1948) is a Hungarian judoka. He competed in the men's lightweight event at the 1972 Summer Olympics.

References

1948 births
Living people
Hungarian male judoka
Olympic judoka of Hungary
Judoka at the 1972 Summer Olympics
Sportspeople from Pécs